Harry Shunk (born Schunk or Schunke; 1924 – June 26, 2006) was a German photographer, most noted for his cooperation with János Kender from 1957/58 to 1973 under the name Shunk-Kender. He was, along with his partner Kender, the photographer of hundreds of artists works during the 1960s and 1970s in New York and Europe. When they disbanded in 1973, Kender gave Shunk control of the joint material and Shunk continued working with photography for a further 30 years.

He died in obscurity in Westbeth, New York City.

Collections
Shunk's work is held in the following permanent collection:
Smithsonian American Art Museum, Washington, D.C.: 7 works (as of July 2021)

References

External links
Shunk Archive - Shunk-Kender Photography Collection, 1958–1973

Photographers from Saxony
1924 births
2006 deaths
People from Leipzig (district)
German emigrants to the United States